Salumber was a Lok Sabha parliamentary constituency of Rajasthan.

Members of Parliament

1952-76:Constituency does not exist
1977: Laljibhai Meena, Janata Party
1980: Jai Narain Roat, Indian National Congress
1984: Alkha Ram, Indian National Congress
1989: Nand Lal Meena, Bharatiya Janata Party
1991: Bheru Lal Meena, Indian National Congress
1996: Bheru Lal Meena, Indian National Congress
1998: Bheru Lal Meena, Indian National Congress
1999: Bheru Lal Meena, Indian National Congress
2004: Mahaveer Bhagora, Bharatiya Janata Party
2008 onwards:Constituency does not exist

Election results

See also
 Salumbar
 List of Constituencies of the Lok Sabha

References

Constituencies established in 1977
Former Lok Sabha constituencies of Rajasthan
Former constituencies of the Lok Sabha
2008 disestablishments in India
Constituencies disestablished in 2008